Precious Marange (born 26 November 1982) is a Zimbabwean cricketer. She is a left-handed batter and bowls right-arm fast-medium. She has represented Zimbabwe in ICC Women's World Twenty20 Qualifier and Women's Cricket World Cup Qualifier.

Marange was named in Zimbabwe's squad for the 2008 Women's Cricket World Cup Qualifier in South Africa. She made her Women's Twenty20 International (WT20I) debut for Zimbabwe against Namibia women on 5 January 2019. In February 2021, she was named in Zimbabwe's squad for their home series against Pakistan.

In October 2021, Marange was named in Zimbabwe's Women's One Day International (WODI) squad for their four-match series against Ireland. The fixtures were the first WODI matches after Zimbabwe gained WODI status from the ICC in April 2021. She made her WODI debut on 5 October 2021, for Zimbabwe against Ireland.

In November 2021, she was named in Zimbabwe's team for the 2021 Women's Cricket World Cup Qualifier tournament in Zimbabwe.

References

External links
 
 

1982 births
Living people
Zimbabwean women cricketers
Zimbabwe women One Day International cricketers
Zimbabwe women Twenty20 International cricketers
Eagles women cricketers